James Daniel Williams (June 6, 1942 – July 1, 2015) was an American politician.

Born in Limestone County, Alabama, Williams went to Auburn University and served in the Alabama National Guard. He was a member of the Alabama House of Representatives from the 5th District, serving from 2011 to 2015. He was a member of the Republican party. From 1992 to 2010, he was mayor of Athens, Alabama. Williams also served on the Athens City Council and the Athens Board of Education. He died of leukemia at his home in Athens, Alabama on July 1, 2015.

References

School board members in Alabama
Alabama city council members
Mayors of places in Alabama
Republican Party members of the Alabama House of Representatives
People from Athens, Alabama
Auburn University alumni
1942 births
2015 deaths
Baptists from Alabama
20th-century Baptists